A dermatomycosis is a skin disease caused by a fungus. This excludes dermatophytosis.

Examples of dermatomycosis are tinea and cutaneous candidiasis.These fungal infections impair superficial layers of the skin, hair and nails.

References

External links 

Dermatologic terminology